Reice Jordan Charles-Cook (born 8 April 1994) is an professional footballer who plays as a goalkeeper for Bromley. Born in England, Charles-Cook represents the Grenada national team.

Charles-Cook began his career at Arsenal, and enjoyed a loan spell at non-league Chelmsford City in February 2013, before signing with Bury five months later. He made his debut in the English Football League in March 2014 and then signed with Coventry City four months later. He spent the first part of the 2014–15 season on loan at Nuneaton Town and then established him in the starting eleven at Coventry during the 2015–16 season, before losing his place when Tony Mowbray left the club in September 2016. He spent the 2017–18 season at Swindon Town and joined Danish Superliga club SønderjyskE in October 2018. He joined Shrewsbury Town in January 2019 and spent the 2019–20 season with Macclesfield Town.

Career

Early career
Born and raised in Forest Hill, Lewisham, London, Reice-Cook became a goalkeeper after being diagnosed with a heart murmur as a child, which would have been potentially dangerous to an outfield player. He was a youth player at Arsenal and made his under-21 debut at the age of 14. He signed his first professional contract there in 2012, before joining Chelmsford City of the Conference South for a month long loan on 3 February 2013; his brother, Anthony, played for Chelmsford, who needed a stand in for the injured Stuart Searle. He made his debut for Glenn Pennyfather's "Clarets" the next day, in a 1–1 home draw with Billericay Town. He returned to the Emirates Stadium after having played a total of three games. He later admitted he found the transition from academy player at Premier League giants Arsenal into lower-league football difficult: "I like to have a laugh and that, people say I’m not serious, people like to say: 'You’re not at Arsenal anymore.' That’s what a lot of managers like to use as an excuse [for not picking me]".

After a trial at Bristol City, he signed a one-year contract with Bury on 14 July 2013; "Shakers" boss Kevin Blackwell commented that "we haven't got a young goalkeeper and Reice fits the bill". His agent, Lee Payne, said that "the goalkeeping coach at Bury is Fred Barber. There are not many keeper coaches in the game with a better track record; the opportunity for Reice to be working full-time with Fred is an incredible one for him, and so we were all delighted to grab at it when it arose". He made his League Two debut on 15 March 2014, in a goalless draw at Southend United; he came on as a half-time substitute for Brian Jensen. He started the next match, a 2–1 defeat at Torquay United. He made no further appearances for the club and left Gigg Lane at the end of the 2013–14 season.

Coventry City
On 18 July 2014, Charles-Cook signed a one-year deal with League One club Coventry City, with an option for a second year, after impressing goalkeeping coach Steve Ogrizovic on trial with his athleticism. On 1 August, he was loaned out to Nuneaton Town in the Conference Premier until January; he had already been playing for Brian Reid's "Boro" in pre-season friendlies. On 11 October, he was sent off in a 4–1 loss at Welling United, though manager Liam Daish refused to blame him for the defeat. He made a total of 17 appearances at Liberty Way before being recalled from his loan spell by Coventry manager Steven Pressley on 11 November; he also had his contract extended until the end of the 2015–16 season; Nuneaton went on to be relegated in last place at the end of the 2014–15 campaign.

He made his first-team debut for Coventry on 11 August 2015, in a League Cup first round game at Rochdale, which the team lost on penalties after a 1–1 draw. Manager Tony Mowbray said that "he showed brilliant awareness and sharpness, his distribution was good and I was really pleased with him". Following an illness to Lee Burge, Charles-Cook made his league debut for Coventry at the Ricoh Arena in a 3–0 victory over Shrewsbury Town on 3 October. He held onto his first-team place after Burge's full recovery to fitness, keeping a further two clean sheets against Yeovil Town in the Football League Trophy and against Fleetwood Town in League One. He played the next two matches for Coventry against Blackpool and Rochdale respectively and kept clean sheets in both, which made him the first Coventry goalkeeper to keep clean sheets in his first four league games and also set a club post-war record for the most consecutive minutes without conceding a goal. He was also named on the Football League Team of the Week for 5–11 October. He signed a new contract in November to commit his future to the "Sky Blues" until June 2018.

Charles-Cook started the 2016–17 season as first choice goalkeeper for Coventry. However, he was dropped by interim manager Mark Venus after making an error which lead to a goal in a 2–2 draw with AFC Wimbledon on 28 September. Mowbray left the club the following day and Charles-Cook later said that he "was the first to properly trust me and was like a second dad to me, so when he left I didn’t really take it well as I’ve never had someone’s trust like that before". He played in five of the club's EFL Trophy games under Russell Slade, though both Slade and his successor, Mark Robins, opted for Burge in league matches. He was an unused substitute as Coventry beat Oxford United in the 2017 EFL Trophy final at Wembley. Speaking in July, Robins denied freezing Charles-Cook out of the first-team picture after signing Liam O'Brien.

Swindon Town
On 31 August 2017, Charles-Cook signed a two-year deal with League Two side Swindon Town. Following the suspension of first-choice goalkeeper, Lawrence Vigouroux, he made his debut for the "Robins" in their 2–1 away defeat against Cheltenham Town on 7 October. He held on to his first-team place following Vigouroux's return, as manager David Flitcroft felt his "all-round game has been fantastic and he fully deserves to keep his position". However his place at the County Ground was questioned after he conceded a number of late goals in February, which led to him being defended by caretaker manager Matt Taylor. He was dropped however, and featured just once under new boss Phil Brown before he was released by Swindon at the end of the 2017–18 season.

SønderjyskE
Charles-Cook spent time training with Crewe Alexandra, on the recommendation of his former goalkeeping coach Fred Barber. On 4 October 2018, he joined Danish Superliga side SønderjyskE on a deal until the end of the year; he was signed to provide competition for experienced German goalkeeper Sebastian Mielitz. He made one appearance at Haderslev in the fourth round of the Danish Cup on 7 November, a 2–1 loss after extra time to Esbjerg fB.

Shrewsbury Town
On 15 January 2019, Charles-Cook returned to English football when he signed for League One side Shrewsbury Town on a deal until the end of the 2018–19 season; manager Sam Ricketts said that he had acted quickly to fill the gap left by Joel Coleman's recall to Huddersfield Town. He never made his debut at the New Meadow, and instead sat on the bench behind first Steve Arnold then Jonathan Mitchell. He was offered a new contract by the "Shrews" in the summer, which he rejected.

Macclesfield Town
Charles-Cook signed for League Two side Macclesfield Town on a one-year deal on 9 August 2019; six days before manager Sol Campbell departed to Southend United. The good form of loanee Owen Evans meant that Charles-Cook featured in just three EFL Trophy group games under Daryl McMahon, before Evans was recalled to Wigan Athletic, which allowed Charles-Cook to make his league debut at Moss Rose under the stewardship of caretaker-manager Danny Whitaker in a 1–1 draw with Oldham Athletic on 11 January; Charles-Cook said that "I loved every minute of it and it’s what I’ve been waiting for". Ironically though, new manager Mark Kennedy signed Jonathan Mitchell on loan from Derby County, who again kept Charles-Cook stuck on the bench. He was released on 24 June 2020.

Boreham Wood
Charles-Cook joined Boreham Wood on a short-team deal ahead of the National League playoffs in July 2020. He was released without making any appearances.

Welling United
Charles-Cook joined Welling United for the 2020-21 season.

Bromley
Having trained with the Club, Charles-Cook signed for Bromley on 27th August 2021.

Hampton & Richmond Borough
On 15 March 2022, Charles-Cook made the move to Hampton & Richmond Borough in an emergency move after first-choice goalkeeper, Alan Julian tested positive for COVID-19.

Dartford
On 1 April 2022, Charles-Cook made the move to Dartford until the end of the season.

Return to Bromley
On 5th August 2022, it was announced that Charles-Cook had returned to Bromley, following a successful pre-season trial.

Style of play
Charles-Cook is a goalkeeper with excellent shot stopping abilities, athleticism and agility.

International career
Born in England, Charles-Cook is of Grenadian and Jamaican descent. He was called up to represent the Grenada national football team for matches in June 2021. He debuted for Grenada in a 1–0 2022 FIFA World Cup qualification loss to Antigua and Barbuda on 4 June 2021.

Personal life
He is the brother of fellow professional footballers Anthony Cook and Regan Charles-Cook. His uncle, James, is a former British super middleweight boxing champion.

Career statistics

Honours
Coventry City 
EFL Trophy: 2017

Dartford 
Kent Senior Cup: 2021–22

References

External links

1994 births
Living people
Footballers from Lewisham
People with acquired Grenadian citizenship
Grenadian footballers
Grenada international footballers
English footballers
Grenadian people of Jamaican descent
Sportspeople of Jamaican descent
English sportspeople of Grenadian descent
English sportspeople of Jamaican descent
Black British sportspeople
Association football goalkeepers
Arsenal F.C. players
Chelmsford City F.C. players
Bury F.C. players
Coventry City F.C. players
Nuneaton Borough F.C. players
Swindon Town F.C. players
SønderjyskE Fodbold players
Shrewsbury Town F.C. players
Macclesfield Town F.C. players
Boreham Wood F.C. players
Welling United F.C. players
Bromley F.C. players
Hampton & Richmond Borough F.C. players
Dartford F.C. players
English Football League players
National League (English football) players
English expatriate footballers
Expatriate men's footballers in Denmark
English expatriate sportspeople in Denmark
Grenadian expatriate sportspeople in Denmark
2021 CONCACAF Gold Cup players